Talakaicha Island is an island of the Andaman Islands. It belongs to the North and Middle Andaman administrative district, part of the Indian union territory of Andaman and Nicobar Islands.

Geography
The island belongs to the West Baratang Group and lies between Spike Island and Boning Island.

Administration
Politically, Talakaicha Island, along neighboring Baratang Islands, is part of Rangat Taluk.

References 

 Geological Survey of India

Islands of North and Middle Andaman district
Tourist attractions in the Andaman and Nicobar Islands
Uninhabited islands of India
Islands of India
Islands of the Bay of Bengal